Eduard Vyacheslavovich Gritsun (born 4 February 1976 in Rostov-on-Don) is a retired Russian professional road bicycle racer.

Major results 

1996
 1st Stage 5 Volta a la Comunitat Valenciana
 2nd  Team pursuit, Summer Olympics
 3rd Overall Volta a Tarragona
1st Stage 3
1997
 1st Overall Volta a Tarragona
 2nd Overall Sachsen-Tour
1998
 1st Overall Vuelta a Navarra
1st Stages 5 & 6
 3rd Time trial, National Road Championships
1999
 2nd Overall Hessen-Rundfahrt
1st Stage 2
 3rd  Team pursuit, UCI Track World Championships
 4th Overall Niedersachsen-Rundfahrt
2000
 8th GP Rudy Dhaenens
2002
 5th Time trial, National Road Championships
 5th Circuito de Getxo
 9th Clásica de Almería
2003
 1st Stage 2 Volta a Tarragona

External links 
 
 
 

1976 births
Living people
Russian male cyclists
Russian track cyclists
Olympic cyclists of Russia
Cyclists at the 1996 Summer Olympics
Cyclists at the 2000 Summer Olympics
Olympic silver medalists for Russia
Sportspeople from Rostov-on-Don
Olympic medalists in cycling
Medalists at the 1996 Summer Olympics